Savannah is a ghost town in Butler County, Nebraska, United States.

History
Savannah was established circa 1859, benefiting from its proximity to Shinn's Ferry, a ferry service across the Platte River. It was the first county seat of Butler County, as voted in an 1868 election. A post office was established at Savannah in 1870, and remained in operation until being discontinued in 1882. An 1873 election relocated the county seat to the newly established David City, and Savannah's residents and merchants moved their buildings to the new town.

The village ultimately disappeared, but Savannah Township carries on the name.

References

Geography of Butler County, Nebraska